Stephen Clarke (born 15 October 1958 in St. Albans) is a British author. He writes mainly about France. He published six novels featuring a British protagonist named Paul West.

Career
Before writing books, Clarke wrote comedy sketches for BBC Radio 4 and comic-book stories for the U.S. cartoonist and comics artist Gilbert Shelton. Having graduated from Oxford University he spent several years working in Glasgow as a bilingual lexicographer for the dictionary firm HarperCollins. He then moved to work for a French press group.

Works
On 1 April 2004 Clarke successfully self-published A Year in the Merde It found attention in France too. Later Clarke sold the rights to Transworld in the UK, Bloomsbury Publishing PLC in the United States, Penguin in Canada and Random House in Australia. It was eventually published in altogether about 20 languages.

The sequel Merde Actually appeared in 2005, and was followed by a non-fiction book (Talk to the Snail, a humorous guide to the French language and the French) in 2006. The third novel about Paul West was published in July 2007 in Great Britain and one year later in the USA: Merde Happens, This time Englishman Paul West explores the United States instead of France. Clarke's fourth novel Dial M for Merde played again in France (this time South of France) and was published in the UK on 10 September 2008. The fifth novel The Merde Factor about Paul West returning to Paris was published on 13 September 2012.

Stephen Clarke's second non-fiction offering, 1000 Years of Annoying the French, was published in the United Kingdom on 18 March 2010. It concentrates on conflicts between the French and the "Anglo-Saxons" over the past ten centuries, In Amazon.co.uk's bestseller lists, at one point the book was simultaneously at number 4 in the history chart and number one in humour.

Bibliography

Fiction 

The 'Merde' Series
A Year in the Merde European Countries (2004)
Merde Actually (2005) - Known as In the Merde for Love in the USA.
Merde Happens A roadtrip across Americas (2007)
Dial M for Merde Based in the South of France (2008)
The Merde Factor Paul West's Parisian update (2012)
Merde in Europe Paul West's is One Brit in Brussels (2016)

Stand-alone
A Brief History of the Future (2011) What if teleportation was really possible? Englishman Richie Fisher is about to find out...

Non-fiction 

Talk to the Snail (2006) An ironical survival guide to the French way of life.
1000 Years of Annoying the French (2010) A satirical version of British-French history.
Paris Revealed - The Secret Life of a City (2011) A behind the scenes look of Paris.            
Dirty Bertie: An English King Made in France (2014) A biography of Edward VII
How the French Won Waterloo (or think they did) (2016) A look at the French attitude to Waterloo
The French Revolution and What Went Wrong (2018)

References

External links

  Stephen Clarke's official website.
 Lanie Goodman: "Merde Turns to Gold", The Guardian (29 June 2004). The first newspaper article about Stephen in the British national press.
 Stephen Clarke Interview: 1,000 years of annoying the French
 Stephen Clarke Interview: Paris Revealed - The Secret Life of a City

1958 births
Living people
British male journalists
21st-century British novelists
British emigrants to France
British male novelists
21st-century British male writers